Stenocarpus davallioides, commonly known as the fern-leaved stenocarpus, is a species of flowering plant in the family Proteaceae and is endemic to north Queensland. It is a tree with simple or pinnate adult leaves, groups of creamy-green flowers and narrow oblong follicles.

Description

Taxonomy
Stenocarpus davallioides was first formally described in 1988 by Donald Bruce Foreman and Bernard Hyland in the journal Muelleria from specimens collected by Hyland in 1975. Davallia is a species of fern and the suffix -oides means "like" or "resembling".

Distribution and habitat

Use in horticulture
This species is rarely cultivated, but can grow in subtropical climates, though its frost tolerance is unknown.

References

Flora of Queensland
davallioides
Plants described in 1988
Taxa named by Bernard Hyland
Taxa named by Don Foreman